Breitholtz is a surname. Notable people with the surname include:

Daniel Breitholtz (born 1977), Swedish record producer
Mirja Breitholtz, Swedish songwriter and producer